Westlands is an affluent, mixed-use commercial and residential neighbourhood in Nairobi.

Location
The geographical coordinates of the neighbourhood are: 01°16'01.0"S, 36°48'42.0"E (Latitude:-1.266944; Longitude:36.811667).

Overview
Westlands was a residential district during the colonial period which ended in 1963. Then, it housed mainly Kenyan Asians of Indian descent.

During the 1990s and early 2000s, as land and office space became scarce and exorbitantly priced in the central business district, more businesses have relocated to Westlands and Upper Hill, where land and office space are more readily available and less expensive. Westlands was initially considered part of the Parklands area and straddled what is now Waiyaki Way, originally the Kenya-Uganda Railway. The area has been nicknamed Westie by the youth of Nairobi. It is nowadays typically inhabited by a significant number of the city's expatriate population. Muthaiga, a neighbourhood to the northeast of Westlands, but within the Westlands Division of the county, is rated the most affluent and most expensive neighbourhood in the country.

Points of interest
In Westlands or near the boundaries of the neighbourhood, there are several points of interest, including the following:
 UNHCR branch office in Kenya
 The Sarit Centre Shopping Mall
 Catholic Relief Services- East Africa Regional Office
 The Ukay Shopping Mall
 The Westgate Shopping Mall
 The M. P. Shah Hospital, a private hospital
 Unga House – An office high-rise building
 Mpaka Road – Many businesses have offices on this street
 USAID Towers – The headquarters of USAID in Kenya
 The High Commission of Botswana to Kenya
 The Embassy of Norway to Kenya
 The Embassy of Sweden to Kenya
 Westlands Office Park
 Westlands Primary School
 Datoo's Glassware Mart Ltd
 An office of PricewaterhouseCoopers
 Sankara Hotel
 Dusit D2
 Phillips Pharmaceuticals Head office
 Delta Towers
 Safaricom Head Office
 Art Cafe Head office 
 Java Head office
 Villa Rosa Kempinski Nairobi
 Movenpick Hotel
 A branch of Woolworth Stores
 The Nairobi Institute of Technology

Westlands Division
Prior to 2013, a division named after Westlands was also one of the eight administrative divisions of Nairobi, which is coterminous with Nairobi City. The other divisions were Central, Dagoretti, Embakasi, Kasarani, Kibera, Makadara and Pumwani.

Areas in the Westlands Division were:
Parklands
Kitisuru
Highridge
Kangemi
Kilimani
Lavington
Muthaiga

Currently, there is a constituency and a sub-county named after Westlands; Westlands Constituency is one of the 17 constituencies of Nairobi and Westlands Sub-county is one of the 11 sub-counties of Nairobi.

The postal code for Westlands is 00800

Deep Sea Settlement
Within the Westlands Division lies the Deep Sea Settlement. This is a shanty town of approximately 7,000 inhabitants. In 2005 a private firm, with police support, began bulldozing homes, an act the Kenyan high court deemed illegal. The High Court viewed the 'law' that allowed the private firm land rights' as unfair, because the area harboured squatters for more than 12 years. Combined with this land-rights issue, poverty is rife and is exacerbated by the area's poor sanitation.

Education
The Lycée Denis Diderot opened in Westlands as the École française à Nairobi in 1962. It moved to Kilimani in 1972. There are many other educational institutions in Westlands Division, as detailed in this reference.

See also

 Parklands, Nairobi
 Upper Hill, Nairobi
 Nairobi
 Eastleigh, Nairobi

References

Populated places in Kenya
Cities in the Great Rift Valley
Suburbs of Nairobi